xdelta is a command line program for delta encoding, which generates the difference between two files. This is similar to diff and patch, but it is targeted for binary files and does not generate human readable output.

It was first released in 1997. The developer of xdelta is Joshua MacDonald, who currently maintains the program. The algorithm of xdelta1 was based on the algorithm of rsync, developed by Andrew Tridgell, though it uses a smaller block size.

xdelta3 can generate standardized VCDIFF format, and it realized the compatibility among other delta encoding software which supports the VCDIFF format. It runs on Unix-like operating systems and Microsoft Windows. xdelta can handle up to 264 byte files, and it is suitable for large backups.

References

External links 
 Official homepage
 Project site
 Andrew Tridgell's PHD on rsync, with a section on xdelta (xdelta1)
 RFC 3284, The VCDIFF Generic Differencing and Compression Data (xdelta3)

Free software
Data differencing